Dangerous Love may refer to:

 "Dangerous Love" (song), a 2014 song by Fuse ODG featuring Sean Paul
 Dangerous Love (novel), 1996 novel by Ben Okri
 Dangerous Love (1920 film), silent Western 
 Dangerous Love (1988 film), starring Elliott Gould
 "Dangerous Love", Korean song by T-ara from Bunny Style!
 "Dangerous Love", Japanese rap song by Little from Kick the Can Crew
 "Dangerous Love", song by Racer X from Extreme Volume Live
 "Dangerous Love", TV episode of Sweet Valley High
 "A Dangerous Love", TV episode of Saints & Sinners